Duke Kang of Qi (died 379 BC) was from 404 to 386 BC the titular ruler of the State of Qi during the early Warring States period of ancient China.  His personal name was Lü Dai (呂貸), ancestral name Jiang (姜), and Duke Kang was his posthumous title.  He was the final Qi ruler from the House of Jiang.

Reign
Duke Kang succeeded his father, Duke Xuan of Qi, who died in 405 BC after 51 years of reign as titular ruler of Qi.  Since Tian Heng killed Duke Xuan's uncle Duke Jian of Qi in 481 BC, the leaders of the Tian clan had been the de facto rulers of Qi.

Tian He was leader of the Tian clan during Duke Kang's reign.  With the lobbying of Marquis Wu of Wei, in 386 BC King An of Zhou, the nominal ruler of all China, officially recognized Tian He as ruler of Qi, ending more than six centuries of rule by the House of Jiang.  Tian He became the first de jure ruler of Qi from the House of Tian, and is posthumously known as Duke Tai of Tian Qi.

After Tian He ascended the throne of Qi, he exiled Duke Kang to Zhifu Island in present-day Shandong Province, where he lived for seven more years and died in 379 BC.

Ancestry

References

Year of birth unknown
Monarchs of Qi (state)
5th-century BC Chinese monarchs
4th-century BC Chinese monarchs
379 BC deaths